John Cunningham (1868 – unknown) was a Scottish footballer. His regular position was as a forward. He was born in Glasgow. He played for Benburb, Glasgow Hibernian, Celtic, Partick Thistle, Heart of Midlothian, Rangers, Thistle, Preston North End, Sheffield United, Aston Villa, Wigan County, and Manchester United.

See also
Played for Celtic and Rangers

References

External links
MUFCInfo.com profile
Profile at The Celtic wiki

1868 births
Footballers from Glasgow
Scottish footballers
Benburb F.C. players
Manchester United F.C. players
Celtic F.C. players
Rangers F.C. players
Partick Thistle F.C. players
Preston North End F.C. players
Heart of Midlothian F.C. players
Sheffield United F.C. players
Aston Villa F.C. players
Year of death missing
Wigan County F.C. players
Thistle F.C. players
Association football forwards